Anzilotti is an Italian surname. Notable people with the surname include:

Dionisio Anzilotti (1867–1950), Italian jurist and judge
Perry Anzilotti (born 1959), American actor

Italian-language surnames